Muybridge's Strings (Maiburijji no ito) is a Canadian-Japanese animated short film, directed by Kōji Yamamura and released in 2011. A meditation on the passage of time, the film contrasts the story of Eadweard Muybridge, the British photographer who was a key innovator in the concept of photographically recording motion, with the story of a contemporary mother in Tokyo who realizes that her daughter is growing up and slipping away from her.

The film won the Excellence Prize at the 2011 Japan Media Arts Festival, and a special prize at the 2012 Hiroshima International Animation Festival. It received a Genie Award nomination for Best Animated Short Film at the 32nd Genie Awards in 2012.

References

External links
 

2011 films
2011 animated films
Canadian animated short films
Japanese animated short films
Films directed by Kōji Yamamura
Films about Japanese Canadians
2010s Canadian films
2010s Japanese films